Yong Zhiwei is a Chinese professional archer who represented China at the 2014 Archery World Cup and the 2014 Asian Games. In archery at the 2014 Asian Games, he won a silver medal in the men's individual recurve event and a gold medal in the men's team recurve event with teammates Gu Xuesong and Qi Kaiyao.

References

Chinese male archers
Living people
Asian Games medalists in archery
Archers at the 2014 Asian Games
Asian Games gold medalists for China
Asian Games silver medalists for China
Medalists at the 2014 Asian Games
Year of birth missing (living people)
21st-century Chinese people